The Roman Catholic Diocese of Puerto Iguazú is in the frontier city of Puerto Iguazú, in the province of Misiones in Argentina.

History
On 16 June 1986, Blessed John Paul II established the Diocese of Puerto Iguazú from the Diocese of Posadas.  It lost territory in 2009 when the Diocese of Oberá was established.

Ordinaries
Joaquín Piña Batllevell S.J. (1986–2006)
Marcelo Raúl Martorell (2006–2020)
Nicolás Baisi (2020- )

References

Puerto Igauzu
Puerto Igauzu
Puerto Igauzu
Puerto Igauzu
1986 establishments in Argentina